Baro Biao - World Wide Wedding is the second album released by Romanian twelve-piece Roma brass band Fanfare Ciocărlia. The album was recorded 1999 at Studio Electrocord in Bucharest, Romania, and mixed at Powerplay in Berlin, Germany. Producers are Henry Ernst and Helmut Neumann. The album was released 1999 by Piranha Musik.

Track listing 
 Asfalt Tango — 6:09
 Manuela Oh Manuela — 4:02
 Sîrba de la laşi — 1:37
 Hora de la monastirea — 1:44
 Mariana — 3:18
 Manea cu voca — 4:34
 Mr. Lobaloba — 2:17
 Ţiganeasca — 1:54
 Doina şi cîntec — 3:19
 Hora lui Pusac — 1:21
 Hai Romale! — 1:50
 Piece de Tariţa — 2:59
 Lume, lume şi Hora — 6:49
 Balaşeanca de 8 ore — 2:27
 Sîrba fluierate — 2:29
 Manea ţiganilor — 3:04
 Casablanca — 2:35
 Baro Biao (Paşcani Wedding) — 5:30

References

1999 albums
Fanfare Ciocărlia albums
Romani in Romania